The 2019 Clarkson Cup was held at Ricoh Coliseum in Toronto on 24 March 2019 with the Calgary Inferno defeating the Canadiennes de Montreal by a score of 5-2. Brianna Decker scored the game-winning goal during a power play opportunity in the second period, with Kacey Bellamy logging the assist. Inferno forward Zoe Hickel was recognized as the First Star of the Game.

Game summary

Playoff seeding

Awards and honors
Playoff MVP: Brianna Decker
First Star of the Game: Zoe Hickel
Second Star of the Game: Ann-Sophie Bettez
Third Star of the Game: Kacey Bellamy

Calgary Inferno – 2019 Clarkson Cup champions
With the victory, Alex Rigsby became the first American-born goaltender to win an Olympic Gold Medal (2018), IIHF World Championship (2017), and a Clarkson Cup championship. Venla Hovi becomes the first player from Finland to win the Clarkson Cup, while Aina Mizukami is the third player from Japan to have won. As a side note, the first two Japanese players to have won, Kanae Aoki and Aina Takeuchi were part of Calgary's first Clarkson Cup win, back in 2016.

Defenders
3 Tori Hickel 
4 Brigette Lacquette 
5 Kelly Murray 
18 Aina Mizukami 
21 Halli Krzyzaniak 
22 Kacey Bellamy 
51 Katelyn Gosling 

Forwards
2 Laura Dostaler 
6 Rebecca Johnston 
7 Venla Hovi 
8 Erica Kromm 
9 Dakota Woodworth 
10 Rhianna Kurio 
11 Eden Murray 
13 Kelty Apperson 
14 Brianna Decker 
16 Rebecca Leslie 
17 Kaitlin Willoughby 
19 Brianne Jenner 
28 Louise Warren 
40 Blayre Turnbull 
44 Zoe Hickel 

Goaltenders
1 Alex Rigsby   
33 Lindsey Post 
41 Annie Belanger 

Coaching and Administrative Staff''

Ryan Hilderman (Head coach)
 Becky McGee, Assistant coach
 Krister Toews, Assistant coach
 Mandi Duhamel, Assistant Coach
Brodie Lefaivre, Trainer
Charley Hasselaar, Trainer
Kurtis Smith, Equipment Manager
Kirsten Haag, General Manager

References

2019
2018–19 in women's ice hockey
Ice hockey competitions in Toronto
2019 in Canadian sports
2019 in Toronto